The Teloglion Fine Arts Foundation (formerly known in English as Teloglion Foundation of Art) was established in Thessaloniki, Central Macedonia, Greece in 1972. It was named after Nestor and Aliki Telloglou, who donated their art collection and their entire property to the Aristotle University of Thessaloniki. Later the university established this foundation in order to house the art collection and make it available to the public.

Introduction
The Teloglion Fine Arts Foundation is a non-profit organisation whose main mission is to familiarize the public with art and culture and to support research and studies about art. Furthermore, the foundation organizes many conferences and seminars, supporting in this way the cooperation with other similar institutions in Greece and abroad. Its large collection comes from donations of various individuals and contains numerous artworks mainly of Greek artists of the 19th and 20th centuries. Since December 1999, the foundation has been installed in a modern building at the upper part of the Aristotle University of Thessaloniki campus. The design of this building was the result of an architectural contest.

Art collection
Nestor's and Aliki's Telloglou donation is the core of the museum's art collection. The main body of the collection includes works of art by important Greek and European artists of the 19th and 20th century (drawings, prints, oil on canvas, sculptures and so on). It also includes artworks from various civilizations: Hellenistic, Corinthian and Roman pottery, statues, especially from the Hellenistic period, samples of Chinese and Arabic art (dishes, vases, etc.), Persian miniatures and a variety of woodreliefs from Thailand.

Later the collection was enriched with various donations from artists and art lovers such as Tonis and Ioanna Spiteris, Demetrios Tsamis and many more. Thus today the collection of the Teloglion Fine Arts Foundation possesses artworks from the most important Greek artists of the 19th century and the beginning of the 20th century, such as works from Gyzis, Savidis, Spyropoulos, Engonopoulos, Mytaras and many others. Finally, the collection also includes the monumental work of art "The World of Cyprus" which is permanently exhibited in the museum.

Museum
The Teloglion Fine Arts Foundation is housed in a 6,500 square meter building located at the northern side of the Aristotle University of Thessaloniki campus. The building is surrounded by a 24,000 square meter forest and its architectural design was the result of an architectural competition held in 1982. It is thought to be one of the most beautiful and best designed buildings of Thessaloniki.

The exhibition area covers three floors and a total area of 2,500 square meters. It is subdivided into smaller independent areas and a small number of auxiliary rooms. The levels of temperature, relative humidity and light inside the exhibition area are closely and constantly monitored through the use of a state-of-the-art system, which controls the environmental conditions in the whole building.

The foundation also owns a medium-sized amphitheater, which is a fully equipped conventional center, able to host a great variety of cultural and scientific events, such as musical events, seminars, lectures and conferences. The amphitheater holds 230 seats and is equipped with advanced megaphone installations, a control room and three independent translation booths.

Organizational structure
The Teloglion Fine Arts Foundation is a non-profit organization, supervised by the Aristotle University of Thessaloniki. It is directed by a board of trustees, which is composed of university professors from various faculties, such as the Faculty of Philosophy, the Faculty of Law, the Polytechnic Faculty and the Faculty of Health Sciences. Furthermore, the museum employs researchers, curators and a technical support team, whose main objective is to make sure that the foundation functions properly.

See also
 Aristotle University of Thessaloniki
 Thessaloniki
 List of museums in Greece

References

External links
Teloglion Fine Arts Foundation official website
The Foundation's electronic gallery
Information about the foundation in the site of the Aristotle University of Thessaloniki
Museums of Macedonia web site

Arts organizations established in 1972
Greek art
Art museums and galleries in Greece
Museums in Thessaloniki
Aristotle University of Thessaloniki
Art museums established in 1972
1972 establishments in Greece
Arts foundations based in Greece